Make It or Break It is an American television drama series which premiered on June 22, 2009 on ABC Family. Set in the world of elite gymnastics, the series follows a group of teen Olympic hopefuls as they train and prepare for their day in the spotlight. The show was picked up for an additional 10 episodes on July 27, 2009, which started airing on January 4, 2010, bringing the number of episodes in the first season to 20.

On January 12, 2010, ABC Family announced that the show was picked up for a second season, which premiered on June 28, 2010 at 10 p.m. ET. Starting on July 13, 2010, new episodes followed Pretty Little Liars. The second mid-season finale aired on August 31, 2010 and the second half of Season 2 premiered on March 28, 2011 and ended on May 23, 2011. It was announced via Twitter from Executive Producer Holly Sorensen that the series is cancelled. The series finale aired on May 14, 2012.

A total of 48 episodes of Make It or Break It have been produced and aired over three seasons, between June 22, 2009 and May 14, 2012.

Series overview

Episodes

Season 1 (2009–10)

Season 2 (2010–11)

Season 3 (2012)
The series was renewed for a third season on September 16, 2011. It premiered on March 26, 2012.

References

Lists of American teen drama television series episodes